Raphael Marcel Holzdeppe (born 28 September 1989) is a German pole vaulter, who was world champion at his event. He lives in Zweibrücken in Germany and represents the sports club LAZ Zweibrücken.

Biography
Holzdeppe, who is of African origin, was adopted by a German couple shortly after his birth. He was born in Kaiserslautern in Germany.

Holzdeppe finished fifth at the 2006 World Junior Championships and won the 2008 World Junior Championships. At the 2007 European Junior Championships, he notably got no result, having no-heighted in the qualifying round. He received the bronze medal at the 2012 Summer Olympics in London, behind countryman Björn Otto and Frenchman Renaud Lavillenie.

His personal best jump is 5.94 metres, achieved on 26 July 2015 set in Nuremberg. A previous personal best was 5.80 metres, achieved in June 2008, setting the world junior record. He holds the world junior indoor record with 5.68 metres, achieved in March 2008 in Halle, Saxony-Anhalt. As a result of this feat, he won the 2008 European Athletics Rising Star of the Year Award.
Meanwhile, he finished his Abitur in the lyceum of Helmholtz in Zweibrücken.

Holzdeppe won his first senior world title at the 2013 World Championships in Athletics in Moscow with a jump of 5.89 m.

Competition record

1No mark in the final

See also
 Germany all-time top lists – Pole vault

References

External links
 
 
 
 
 
 
 

1989 births
Living people
German male pole vaulters
Olympic athletes of Germany
Athletes (track and field) at the 2008 Summer Olympics
Athletes (track and field) at the 2012 Summer Olympics
Athletes (track and field) at the 2016 Summer Olympics
Olympic bronze medalists for Germany
European Athletics Championships medalists
Medalists at the 2012 Summer Olympics
World Athletics Championships athletes for Germany
World Athletics Championships medalists
Olympic bronze medalists in athletics (track and field)
People from Kaiserslautern
European Athletics Rising Star of the Year winners
World Athletics Championships winners
Sportspeople from Rhineland-Palatinate